This is a list of Brazilian television related events from 2008.

Events
25 March - Rafinha Ribeiro wins the eighth season of Big Brother Brasil.
11 May - Actress Christiane Torloni and her partner Álvaro Reis win the fifth season of Dança dos Famosos.
17 December - Rafael Barreto wins the third season of Ídolos. This was the first season to be broadcast on Rede Record.

Debuts

Television shows

1970s
Vila Sésamo (1972-1977, 2007–present)
Turma da Mônica (1976–present)

1990s
Malhação (1995–present)
Cocoricó (1996–present)

2000s
Big Brother Brasil (2002–present)
Dança dos Famosos (2005–present)
Ídolos (2006-2012)

Ending this year

Births

Deaths

See also
2008 in Brazil
List of Brazilian films of 2008